Tu Chang-wei (born 11 May 1982) is a Taiwanese baseball player who competed in the 2004 Summer Olympics.

References

1982 births
Living people
Baseball players from Tainan
Olympic baseball players of Taiwan
Baseball players at the 2004 Summer Olympics
Place of birth missing (living people)